You Better Know It!!! is an album by American jazz vibraphonist Lionel Hampton featuring performances recorded in 1964 for the Impulse! label.

Reception
The Allmusic review by Ron Wynn awarded the album 3 stars and stated "There was no wasted energy or unnecessary or exaggerated solos; just bluesy, assertive, muscular arrangements, accompaniment, and ensemble segments".

Track listing
All compositions by Lionel Hampton except as indicated
 "Ring Dem Bells" (Duke Ellington, Irving Mills) - 3:28
 "Vibraphone Blues" - 5:06
 "Tempo's Birthday" (Hampton, Joe Morris) - 3:58
 "Sweethearts on Parade" (Carmen Lombardo, Charles Newman) - 3:12
 "Moon over My Annie" (Manny Albam) - 5:32
 "Pick-A-Rib" (Benny Goodman, Hampton) - 3:34
 "Trick or Treat" (Albam) - 6:02
 "Cute" (Neil Hefti, Stanley Styne) - 3:05
 "A Taste of Honey" (Ric Marlow, Bobby Scott) - 2:43
 "Swingle Jingle" - 2:54
Recorded at Rudy Van Gelder Studio in Englewood Cliffs, New Jersey on October 26 & 29, 1964

Personnel
Lionel Hampton – vibes, piano, vocals
Clark Terry - trumpet
Ben Webster - tenor saxophone
Hank Jones – piano
Milt Hinton – bass
Osie Johnson – drums

References 

Impulse! Records albums
Lionel Hampton albums
1964 albums
Albums recorded at Van Gelder Studio
Albums produced by Bob Thiele